The 2020–21 Welsh Premier Women's League, also known as Orchard Welsh Premier Women's League due to sponsorship reasons, is the twelfth season of the Women's Welsh Premier League, the top level women's football league in Wales. The season began on 27 September 2020 with the Cardiff City versus Swansea City being the first women's domestic match in Wales to be televised live.

The league was suspended from 23 October 2020 until 9 November 2020 because of a national lockdown due to the COVID-19 pandemic.

Standings

References 

2020-21
2020-21 domestic women's association football leagues
Welsh Premier League, 2020-21 Women